Kavisha Mazzella AM (pronounced KAV-eesh-a Mutt-Sel-la) is an Australian composer, singer-songwriter, folklorist, activist and choirleader whose style has mediterranean, gypsie and Celtic influences. She won an ARIA Award for Best World Music Album for Fisherman's Daughter produced by Mick Thomas (ex Weddings Parties Anything) in 1998. Mazzella has released several studio albums independently.

Early life 
Mazzella was born in 1959 in London, United Kingdom to an Italian father and an Anglo-Burmese mother. In the 1960s the family emigrated to Perth, Western Australia.

In 1981 through researching her Italian heritage Mazzella formed  with brother Giri Antonio Mazzella and Sanjiva Gianni Margio playing Italian folk from the 14th century onwards. They released a cassette "Flowers in the Desert" in 1981.

In 1987 after returning from busking in Europe Mazzella formed the band Rich'N' Famous with Lee Buddle, Gary Burke, Reuben Kooperman, Peter Grayling including John Reed.  Rich 'N' Famous played shows mainly in Fremantle and various festivals such as Woodford, Port Fairy and Brunswick Music festival.

In 1989 Mazzella founded the Fremantle Italian women's choir Joys of the Women with Italian immigrant women. This was documented by Franco Di Chiera's film The Joys of the Women, which received a national television cinema release in 1993. She led them from 1989 to 1993.

In 1996 Mazzella formed the Melbourne Italian Women's choir "la Voce Della Luna".(The Voice of the Moon); in 2000 she was awarded the Italian Government award Italia Nel Mondo for her work in promoting Italian Culture in Australia. She directed la Voce Della Luna until 2013.

In 2004 the Victorian Government commissioned Kavisha to write "Tunc Justus" a choral work celebrating Raffaello Carboni, the famous Italian translator and assistant to Peter Lalor who led the Eureka Stockade uprising in the Victorian Goldfields.The anthem celebrates the Italian connection in the Eureka Stockade.This was first performed at the Echoes of Eureka festival in Ballarat in 2004 to standing ovation. In 2007 Mazzella was commissioned by the Victorian Women's Trust to write the women's Anthem "Love and Justice" to celebrate one hundred years of women's suffrage in Victoria.This premiered in BMW Edge Melbourne Federation Square sung by a choir of over 600 women from regional and metropolitan Melbourne . In 2008 she won the Multicultural Commissions Award for Excellence for her work in community music. From 2011 to 2019 she founded and led the Moon's A Balloon Mental Health Choir in Melbourne.

Mazzella collaborated with Angela Chaplin, the theatre director in Deckchair Theatre Company in Fremantle for many years writing and composing music for shows. In 2002 Mazzella together with co-writers Katherine Thomson and Angela Chaplin won a Helpmann Award for Best New Australian Work for Mavis Goes to Timor.

Advocacy
Kavisha has also worked with indigenous communities in outback Australia teaching songwriting workshops and has also been an advocate for refugees and mental health in many theatre projects. Her concerts and theatre projects promote multicultural harmony and coming together of cultures to share common humanity.

In 2011 Kavisha was awarded an Order of Australia for her services to singing, songwriting and reflecting the experiences of refugees, indigenous and multicultural communities through performance.

Discography

Albums

Soundtracks

Awards and nominations

ARIA Music Awards
The ARIA Music Awards is an annual awards ceremony that recognises excellence, innovation, and achievement across all genres of Australian music. They commenced in 1987. The Cat Empire has won one award.

! 
|-
| 1998
| Fisherman's Daughter
| ARIA Award for Best World Music Album
| 
| rowspan="2"| 
|-
| 2003
| Silverhook Tango
| Best World Music Album
| 
|-

References

External links 
 Official website
 Artist's Facebook page

Living people
1959 births
ARIA Award winners
Australian musicians
Musicians from London
English emigrants to Australia
English people of Burmese descent
English people of Italian descent
Australian people of Italian descent
Australian people of Anglo-Burmese descent
Members of the Order of Australia